Gay Hamilton (born 29 April 1943) is a British actress, most notable for her roles in Stanley Kubrick's Barry Lyndon and Ridley Scott's The Duellists.

Career
Hamilton was born in Uddingston. In the late 1960s and early 1970s, she played the love interest and later wife of Detective Chief Superintendent John Watt (played by Frank Windsor) in the TV series Softly, Softly and its Taskforce spin-off.

She appeared in two episodes of the ITC series Man in a Suitcase (1967), played student teacher Ann Collins in the "Please Sir" episode "Student Princess" (1968), and  Eva Zoref, the wife of Anton Zoref (Ian McShane), in the Space: 1999 episode "Force of Life" (1975). In 1980 she played the part of Dr. Claire Wilson in the Shoestring episode "The Farmer had a Wife". She more recently played Edwina Dunn in EastEnders and Maisie McLintock in Doctors.

Selected filmography
 A Man for All Seasons (1966) - 2nd Handmaiden / 3rd Girl (uncredited)
 A Challenge for Robin Hood (1967) - Maid Marian
 Barry Lyndon (1975) - Nora Brady
 Eclipse (1977) - Cleo
 The Duellists (1977) - Maid
 Questo sì che è amore (1978) - Gwen
 Walking with the Enemy (2013) - Frau Lustig (final film role)

Theatre
 Teeth 'n' Smiles (1976)

References

External links

1943 births
Living people
Scottish television actresses
Scottish film actresses
People from Uddingston